The Club of Odd Volumes is a private social club and society of bibliophiles founded in 1887, in Boston, Massachusetts, USA.

History 
The club was founded on January 29, 1887, with the following intention:
The objects shall be to promote an interest in, and a love for whatever will tend to make literature attractive as given in the form of printed and illustrated volumes, to mutually assist in making researches and collections of first and rare editions, and to promote elegance in the production of Odd Volumes. The term odd is an eighteenth-century usage meaning various or unmatched. By extension, each member of the club is an odd volume.

The Sette of Odd Volumes, an English bibliophile dining-club founded in 1878, was the inspiration for the organization. George Clulow, President of the Sette of Odd Volumes, London, suggested the name The Club of Odd Volumes.

The club began primarily as a dinner club, complementing established social clubs like the Somerset Club, Algonquin Club, Union Club, and Harvard Club. The group conducts lectures, meets regularly for dinners and lunches, collects and publishes books, and develops literary exhibits.

The club hosts authors, book designers, artists, politicians, printers, and people prominent in creative fields. H. G. Wells visited after a monthly dinner meeting in 1906. In January 1921 Harry Houdini gave a talk on Books on Magic and the Theater. Author Amy Lowell and actress Ada Dwyer Russell were guests of the Club in 1923, when Lowell gave a talk on John Keats. Winston Churchill was a guest at the Club, at a private luncheon, April 1949.

Building
The club has been at 77 Mt. Vernon Street in Beacon Hill since it purchased the building 1936. The building was the home of Sarah Wyman Whitman. Prior to 1936, it rented the buildings across the street at 50, 52 and 54 Mt. Vernon Street.

Library and publications
Between its founding and 1900, the club expanded its membership and activities to include an active exhibition and publishing program as well as the maintenance of a library. Members in the Club of Odd Volumes, currently limited to a maximum of 87 (men only), are often associated with Boston's universities, museums and libraries. They often include rare and antiquarian book collectors, curators, scholars, printers and typophiles. The club continues to offer exhibitions on a wide variety of themes, including the printing arts, typography and antiquarian books.

The club has a substantial library of antiquarian books and an archive of letterpress printing.

The collection, only accessible by club members, has about 2,200 titles.

Publications
Internal publications
Representative examples of the Club’s yearbooks and bylaws
 
 
 
 
 

Works of authors and poets
The following is a short selection of published works:

Notable members
Notable members include 

 Theodore L. de Vinne
 F. Holland Day
 William Addison Dwiggins
 Worthington C. Ford
 Edwin Davis French
 Wendell Garrett
 Frederic Goudy
 Curtis Guild Jr.
 Henry-Russell Hitchcock
 Henry Oscar Houghton
 Dard Hunter
 Alfred A. Knopf Sr.
 Frederick William Lehmann
 Arthur D. Little
 A. Lawrence Lowell
 George Harrison Mifflin
 J. P. Morgan
 J. P. Morgan, Jr.
 Fred Ball Rice - Rice & Hutchins
 Bruce Rogers
 Franklin D. Roosevelt
 Rudolf Ruzicka
Robert Gould Shaw II
 Daniel Berkeley Updike 
 Walter Muir Whitehill
 George Parker Winship

Gallery

See also
 List of American gentlemen's clubs
 Books in the United States

Notes

References

1887 establishments in Massachusetts
Beacon Hill, Boston
Bibliophiles
Clubs and societies in Boston
Clubs and societies in the United States
Cultural history of Boston
Hobbyist organizations
Libraries in Beacon Hill, Boston
Literary societies
Organizations established in 1887
Gentlemen's clubs in the United States